Lauren Fix is an automotive expert and analyst based in Buffalo, New York and New York, New York. She has written three books on automobiles. She has appeared on CNN, Fox News, Newsmax TV, CNBC, and USA Radio's Daybreak USA show.

Racing career
Fix began racing in New York in 1981 in the SCCA Solo II Series. She debuted with a third-place finish. By 1989, she switched to road racing and started competing in a historic 1966 Trans Am Mustang. 
She competed in SVRA, HSR and the Canadian G.T. Challenge Cup sanctioned by FIA. Fix operated the Driving Ambitions Performance Driving School at Watkins Glen International Raceway from 1986 to 2001.

Since 2001, Fix raced in the SVRA series in a 1996 Jack Roush Mustang in Vintage TransAm. From 2014 to present, she has raced a 2000 Jaguar XKRS in SVRA.

Media
Fix co-hosts Talk 2 DIY Automotive on DIY, providing demonstrations and tips for auto repair. She hosted the television show local TV networks called Car Smarts.

She has appeared in magazines including Redbook, USA Today, and Woman's World. She has been featured on several national television shows, including Oprah, Fox News, 20/20, The View, and Live with Regis and Kelly. Fix was a regular guest expert on CNBC's On the Money, with Carmen Wong Ulrich.

She wrote a regular Sunday weekly column for The Buffalo News, called "Car Coach".

Every Friday, she appears on Newsmax TV's The Hard Line, hosted by Ed Berliner, to discuss the automotive news of the week.

She is the past automotive editor for Your Life.com magazine as well as the author of Lauren Fix's Guide to Loving Your Car: Everything You Need to Know to Take Charge of Your Car and Get On with Your Life, her third book from St. Martin's Press.

Lauren Fix is a member of the SEMA SBN Steering Committee and the Aftermarket (automotive) Industry Association. She is a registered IMPA International Motor Press Association Journalist with credentials. She is the spokesperson for the non-profit Car Care Council AAIA and the Be Car Care Aware Program.

She was the National Automotive Correspondent for Time Warner Cable, YNN, now known as TWC News; her segments aired twice per week nationally until March 2014 In addition, the Weather Channel has named Lauren Fix their automotive expert for on-air tips and advice.

Professional highlights
 1999: “40 Under 40 Business Award" winner
 2000: Car Care Council Communications Award - AAIA
 2002: Women of the Year - Business Advisory Board of NY
 2003: International Automotive Media Award - Public Service
 2004: Top 25 Women Who Mean Business Award
 2004: Northwood University Automotive Aftermarket Management Award
 2005 and 2006: Best PR Campaign – Business to Consumer
 2007: Stevie Awards - Best Marketing Campaign - "Flood Damaged Cars" from Hurricane Katrina
 2008: Automotive Woman of the Year AAIA
 2009: Inducted into the National Women and Transportation Hall of Fame
 2009: Automotive Communications Award AAIA
 2010: Women Of Distinction Award - Entrepreneur
 2011: Winner of the Automotive Communications Award in the categories Consumer Education and Public Relations Efforts; AAIA
 2011: Winner of the Automotive Communications Award - TV Segment for The Car Coach TV show; AAIA
 Juror - Internet Car of the Year
 Women's World Car of the Year - judge
 2014: Woman of the Year; SEMA
 2015: juror - North American Car of the Year
 2016: Board of Directors, Secretary / Treasurer - North American Car of the Year Awards (NACTOY)
 2018 - 2020: Board of Directors, President - North American Car of The Year Awards (NACTOY)

Personal
Fix is her real last name. Her daughter is Shelby Fix, the "Teen Car Coach" / "Car Coach 2.0", and was named after Carroll Shelby. Her husband, Paul Fix, is a professional Trans-Am Series driver. Her son, actor Paul Fix III, has appeared on As the World Turns.

Selected bibliography
Driving Ambitions (1993)
Performance Tire and Wheel Handbook (1998)
Lauren's Guide To Car Smarts (2008)

References

 Dorsey, Sarah (April 16, 2005) CNN Live Saturday Body of Sarah Lunde has Been Found; A look at Hybrid Automobiles with Lauren Fix - Part 2.
 PrimeZone (March 17, 2006) Spring Shape-Ups for Your Car! With Car Coach Lauren Fix; podcast available at http://www.moreaboutthat.info 
Morales, Natalie. (July 21, 2006) NBC Today Show Profile: Lauren Fix gives tips for women shopping for a new car. Time: 7:00-10:00 AM 
 Lauren Fix on UB alumni site
 Operation 7 Save a Life: Winter Car Safety - WABC

External links
 Lauren Fix, official site

American television journalists
Living people
Writers from Buffalo, New York
Television personalities from Buffalo, New York
University at Buffalo alumni
People from Williamsville, New York
Journalists from New York (state)
American women non-fiction writers
American women television journalists
Year of birth missing (living people)
21st-century American women